In linguistics, mama and papa are considered a special case of false cognates. This is thought to be a coincidence resulting from the process of early language acquisition.

Etymology 
They are, therefore, often among the first word-like sounds made by babbling babies (babble words), and parents tend to associate the first sound babies make with themselves and to employ them subsequently as part of their baby-talk lexicon. Thus, there is no need to ascribe to common ancestry the similarities of !Kung ba, Aramaic abba, Mandarin Chinese , and Persian baba (all "father"); or Navajo amá, Mandarin Chinese , Swahili mama, Quechua mama, and Polish mama (all "mother"). For the same reason, some scientists believe that 'mama' and 'papa' were among the first words that humans spoke.

Linguist Roman Jakobson hypothesized that the nasal sound in "mama" comes from the nasal murmur that babies produce when breastfeeding:

Variants 
Variants using other sounds do occur: for example, in Fijian, the word for "mother" is nana, in Turkish, the word for mother is ana, and in Old Japanese, the word for "mother" was papa. The modern Japanese word for "father", chichi, is from older titi (but papa is more common colloquially in modern Japanese). Very few languages lack labial consonants (this mostly being attested on a family basis, in the Iroquoian and some of the Athabaskan languages), and only Arapaho is known to lack an open vowel /a/. The Tagalog -na- / -ta- ("mom" / "dad" words) parallel the more common ma / pa in nasality / orality of the consonants and identity of place of articulation.

Examples by language family
"Mama" and "papa" in different languages:

Afro-Asiatic languages
Aramaic: Imma for mother and Abba for father
Hebrew: Ima for mother and Aba for father
When actually talking to them, they are called Mama for Mother and Baba for Father
Berber: Yemma/Ma for mother and Aba/Baba for father

Austroasiatic languages
 Khmer has different words that indicate different levels of respect. They include the intimate ម៉ាក់ (mak/meak) and ប៉ា (pa), the general ម៉ែ (mai/me) and ពុក (puk), and the formal ម្ដាយ (madaay) and ឪពុក (ovpuk).
Vietnamese, mẹ is mother and bố is father. Má and ba or cha respectively in Southern Vietnamese.

Austronesian languages
Tagalog, mothers can be called ina, and fathers ama. Two other words for the same in common use, nanay and tatay, came from Nahuatl by way of Spanish. Owing to contact with Spanish and English, mamá, papá, ma(m(i)), and dad  or dádi are also used.
In Indonesian, mother is called Emak (mak) or Ibu (buk), father is called Bapak or Ayah. The modern Indonesian word for father is papi and mother is mami. The words mami and papi have been used since the days of the Dutch Indies Colonial, causing the mixing of the words "Papa & Mama", Europe to "Papi & Mami", Indonesia.
In Māori, Papa is the name of the Earth goddess in the creation myth, and as such is sometimes used to refer to the embodiment of motherhood. The sky father in the same myth is called Rangi.

Dravidian languages 

 Though amma and nana are used in Tulu, they are not really Tulu words but used due to the influence of neighboring states' languages. The actual words for mother in Tulu is nane and the word for father in Tulu is amme. Note that the usage of these words is at odds with the usage pattern in other languages (similar to Georgian in that sense).
 In Telugu, "Thalli" and "Thandri" are used for mother and father in formal Telugu. amma and nana or bapu are used for mother and father for the informal way. Notice how nana refers to maternal grandfather in Hindi, and how that differs from its Telugu meaning. "Nayana" is also used for father in informal Telugu in the Rayalaseema region of Andhra Pradesh and Telangana of India. Note that the usage of these words is at odds with the usage pattern in other languages (similar to Tulu and Georgian in that sense).
 In Malayalam, the common word for mother is "Amma" and for father is "Achan". In scholastic usage, Mathav and Pithav are used respectively. "Achan" is either a transformed Malayalam equivalent of the Sanskrit "Arya" for "Sir/Master" (Arya - >Ajja -> Acha) or originated from a native Dravidian word that means paternal grandfather (cf.Ajja in Kannada and Ajje in Tulu meaning grandfather and Achan is an uncommon word for father in Tamil). Other words like "Appan","Appachan","Chaachan" (all 3 forms common among Christians, Appan is also used by Hindus of Tamil influenced areas),"Baappa/Vaappa" ,"Uppa"(both common among Muslims) etc. are also used for father, and words such as "Umma"(among Muslims), "Ammachi"(among Christians) for mother. Christians use Achan to mean Church Father."Thalla" which means mother and "Thantha" which means father are currently never used formally and are considered derogatory/disrespectful. "Thaayi" is another old and extremely uncommon word for mother. 
 In Tamil, "thaayi" and "thanthai" are the formal Tamil words for mother and father; informally "amma" for mother and "appa" for father are much more common.
In the Kannada language, "thaayi" for mother and "thande" for father are used formally. But to address them informally Kannadigas use amma for mother and appa for father.

Uralic languages
 Estonian ema for mother and isa for father.
For formal usage, these words are applied, but both mama and papa are used as well, in informal speech. For family internal addressing, apu and anyu (variants of "apa" and "anya," respectively) are also used.
 Finnish emä means mother, though it is archaic when applied to humans. The modern word is "äiti".

Indo-European languages
In the Proto-Indo-European language, *mā́tēr (modern reconstruction: *méh₂tēr) meant "mother" while *pǝtḗr (modern reconstruction: *ph₂tḗr)  and átta meant "father".

Romance
 Catalan mamà / mama and papà / papa
 French maman / papa (mother / father) and mamie / papy (grandmother / grandfather)
 Galician nai, mai / pai
 Italian mamma and papà or babbo
 Lombard mader
 Portuguese mãe / pai (mother / father); Portugal: mamã / papá; Brazil: mamãe / papai
 Romanian mama / mamă (mother) and tata / tată (father)
 Sardinian mama and babbu
 Spanish mamá and papá

Balto-Slavic
 Belarusian мама (mama) for mom and тата (tata) for dad.
 Bulgarian мама (mama) for mom and татко (tatko) for dad; майка (maika) for mother and баща (bashta) for father; баба (baba) for grandmother and дядо (dyado) for grandfather. For aunt and uncle: стринка (strinka) for father's brother's wife and чичо (chicho) for father's brother / вуйна (vuyna) for mother's brother's wife and вуйчо (vuycho) for mother's brother. 
 Czech máma and táta
 Lithuanian mama
 Rusyn мама (mama) for mom and татo (tato) for dad.
 Polish mama and tata
 Russian мама (mama). In Russian papa, deda and baba mean "father", "grandfather" and "grandmother" respectively, though the last two can represent baby-talk (baba is also a slang word for "woman", and a folk word for a married woman with a child born). In popular speech tata and tyatya for "dad" were also used until the 20th century. In some dialects, papa means "food".
 Serbo-Croatian мама/mama for mom, and тата/tata for dad. 
 Slovak mama / tata, also tato. In addition, papanie / papať means "food" / "eat" respectively.
 Slovene mama / ata, also tata
 Ukrainian мама (mamа) and тато (tato) (папа (papa) in South-eastern dialects).

Germanic
 Dutch mama / mam / ma and papa / pap / pa
 English mama / mum/mummy (standard British) / mom/mommy (US/Canada/sometimes regional Irish) / momma / mam (regional British and regional Irish) / ma and dad / dada / daddy / papa / pa / da
 Faroese mamma
 German Mama and Papa
 Icelandic mamma; pabbi
 Norwegian mamma and pappa
 Swedish mamma and pappa
 Swiss German mami, but mame in the dialect from Graubünden and mamma in certain dialects from the Canton of Bern

Celtic
 Irish "Máthair"
Scottish Gaelic màthair / athair
 Welsh mam tad (mutates to dad)
 Breton mamm (mutates to vamm) and tad (mutates to dad or zad)

Indo-Aryan
Old Indo-Aryan (Sanskrit): Mātṛ / Ambā for "mother" and Pitṛ / Tātaḥ for "father".

 Assamese has ma ("মা") and aai ("আই") as "mother" and deuta ("দেউতা") and pitai ("পিতাই") as "father". However, due to English borrowings, the words mamma and pappa are sometimes used today.
 Bengali, the words maa ("মা") and baba ("বাবা") are used for "mother" and "father".
 Gujarati uses mātā, or mā, for mother and bāpuji, or pitā, for father. Informally, the terms mammi and pappā are also used, possibly due to English influence. 
 Hindi has the word mātā and pitaji as the formal words for "mother" and "father", though the shorter informal term maa and pita is more common. Due to English borrowings, the words mamma and pappa are also common. 
 Konkani language, the word "aai" for "mother" and "baba" "father" are used, given the language's close similarity to Marathi. However, due to English borrowings, the words mamma and pappa are much more common today.
 Maithili language has the word Mami and Papa to refer mother and father respectively, which were borrowed from English and are very popular in Mithila federal state of Nepal and Bihar state of India.
 Marathi Aai (“आई”) for mother and Baba (“बाबा”) for father. In some parts of Maharashtra Amma ("अम्मा") for mother and Appa ("अप्पा") or Tatya ("तात्या") for father is also used. However, due to English borrowings, the words mummy and pappa are much more common today in urban areas. 
 Nepali language has the words "ama" or "ma" to refer to mother and "baba" or "ba" for father.
 Odia uses bapa (ବାପା) for father and maa(ମା), bou (ବୋଉ) for mother. However, due to English borrowings, the words mamma/mommy and pappa are much more common today.
 Sinhalese, the word for mother originally was "abbe" ("abbiyande") and father was "appa " ("appanande"). Use of "amma" for mother and "nana" for father is due to heavy influence of Tamil. In some areas of Sri Lanka, particularly in the Central Province, Sinhalese use the word "nanachhi" for father.
 Urdu the words for mother are maa/mɑ̃ː ماں, madar مادر or walida والدہ formally and ammi امی, 'mama' مما informally, whereas father is baap باپ (not used as salutation), pedar''' پدر or 'walid' والد formally and baba بابا or abba ابّا or abbu ابّو informally.

Other Indo-European languages
 Albanian nena/nëna / mama
 (Modern) Greek μάνα, μαμά (mana, mama) and μπαμπάς (babas)
 Hittite 𒀭𒈾𒀸 (annaš, "mother") and 𒀜𒋫𒀸 (attaš, "father")
 Pashto moor مور is the word for Mother. Plaar پلار is the word for Father and baba بابا is used for father as well.
 Persian madar مادر is the formal word for mother, whereas مامان or maman is the informal word for mother. Pedar پدر is the formal word for father whereas baba or بابا is the informal word for father.
 Kurdish dayê and yadê or dê is the word for mother.
Lurish dā دا and dāleka دالکه is the word for mother, and is bowa or bawa is the word for father.

Kartvelian languages 
 Georgian is notable for having its similar words "backwards" compared to other languages: "father" in Georgian is მამა (mama), while "mother" is pronounced as დედა (deda). პაპა papa stands for "grandfather".

Mayan languages
Ch'ol: ñaTzotzil: me'Tzeltal: meNiger-Congo languages
Igbo: Mama / Nne / NmaSwahili: Mama and BabaYoruba: Màmá / Ìyá and Bàbá
Zulu: Mama and BabaSino-Tibetan languages
Bodo, बिमा (bi-ma) and बिफा (bi-fa) are the words for "mother" and "father" respectively. However, parents are usually referred to by their children as आइ/आइयै (aai/aywi) or मा (ma) and आफा (afa) or बाबा (baba) — "Mom" and "Dad."
Note that the f sound was pronounced bilabially (as with p or b) in older and some other forms of Chinese, thus fu is related to the common "father" word pa. And sometimes in informal language, they use mā and bà for short. 
 Taiwanese Hokkien,  and  refer to "mother" and "father" respectively. Note that some of the b sounds in modern Taiwanese was pronounced as m in older Chinese languages, hence  is related to the common "mother" word m.
Tibetan uses amma for mother and nana for father.

Kra–Dai languages
 Thai, "mother" is แม่ (mê ) and "father" is พ่อ (phô ). มะ (Má ) and บะ (ba ) or ฉะ (cha ) respectively in Southern Thai. Colloquially, mamà and papà are also used.
 Lao, "mother" is ແມ່ (maê) and "father" is ພໍ່ (phô).

Turkic languages
 In Turkish, both anne and ana mean mother, and baba and ata means father. Also, nene can be used for grandma and dede for grandpa.
 Uyghur, an East Asian Turkic language, uses ana or apa for mother, and ata or dada for father.

Other families and language isolates
Basque: ama for mother and aita for father.
Japanese, 父 (chichi) and 母 (haha) are for "father" and "mother" respectively in formal style. They are the basic words which do not combine with honorifics *papa (modern Japanese  derives from the Voiceless bilabial fricative ) which in turn is from the older *p.) Japanese has also borrowed informal mama and papa along with the native terms, stemming from American influence post-World War II. Before the borrowing became common, a child usually called its mother おかあさん (‘’okāsan’’), かあちゃん (‘’kāchan’’), or so, and it’s father おとうさん (‘‘otōsan’’), とうちゃん (‘’tōchan’’), etc.. On the other hand, マンマ(‘’mamma’’) means “food” in baby talk. 
Korean, 엄마 (eom-ma) and 아빠 (a-bba) are mom and dad in informal language, whereas the formal words are 아버지 (a-beo-ji) and 어머니 (eo-meo-ni) for father and mother. Korean is usually considered a language isolate with no living relatives, but some authorities differ.
Kutenai, a language isolate of southeastern British Columbia, uses the word Ma.Sumerian: 𒀀𒈠 / amaMapudungun: Chachay and papay are respectively "daddy" and "mommy", Chaw and Ñuke being "father" and "mother", respectively. Chachay and papay'' are also terms of respect or sympathy towards other members of the community.

See also
 Ab (Semitic)
 Onomatopoeia

References

Phonology
Language acquisition
Language comparison
Kinship terminology
Parenting